The Sixth Commandment of the Ten Commandments could refer to:
 "Thou shalt not murder" under the Philonic division used by Hellenistic Jews, Greek Orthodox and Protestants except Lutherans, or the Talmudic division of the third-century Jewish Talmud.
 "Thou shalt not commit adultery" under the Augustinian division used by Roman Catholics and Lutherans.